Big Isaac is an unincorporated community in Doddridge County, West Virginia, United States. The Big Isaac post office closed on December 31, 1962.

According to tradition, the community bears the name of Periue "Big" Isaac, an early settler noted for his especially large shoe size.

Gallery

References

Unincorporated communities in Doddridge County, West Virginia
Unincorporated communities in West Virginia